Sajad Gani Lone (born 1966) is an Indian politician, and former Member of the Legislative Assembly elected from the Handwara constituency. He is the chairman of Jammu and Kashmir People's Conference.

Early and personal life
Sajjad Lone was born on 9 December 1966. Sajjad Gani Lone is the youngest of the two sons of Abdul Ghani Lone, who was assassinated in a rally in Srinagar in 2002. His brother, Bilal Gani Lone, is a member of Hurriyat Conference's Executive Council. His sister, Shabnam Gani Lone, is a lawyer by profession and an independent politician from Kupwara, J&K. 

Sajjad attended Burn Hall School in Srinagar and graduated from the University of Wales, College of Cardiff, UK in 1989.

Sajjad Lone is married to Asma Khan, daughter of Amanullah Khan, the Pakistan-based leader of the Jammu and Kashmir Liberation Front. The couple have two sons.

Political career
Lone remained associated with the Hurriyat for a while in early 2000's but in 2004, after the assassination of his father, Lone became the chairman of People's Conference.  

Before he stood as an independent candidate in the 2009 Indian general election from the Baramulla Lok Sabha constituency, he in 2008, at the height of the Amarnath land transfer controversy, believed that the protests were a mass uprising against Indian rule and decided to boycott the Assembly elections. He was defeated by the National Conference candidate Sharifuddin Shariq.

In 2014 Jammu and Kashmir Legislative Assembly election, Lone won Handwara assembly constituency in north Kashmir, by a margin of more than 5000 votes. He was the one of the two People's Conference candidates elected to the state legislative assembly. His party JKPC led in all blocks of Handwara constituency including Rajwar, Ramhal and Magam.

In 2018, days after BJP withdrew its support to the PDP-BJP coalition government in Jammu and Kashmir, Lone staked claim to form the government in the erstwhile state as he possessed the required support of BJP and some other lawmakers. However, the then Governor Satya Pal Malik dissolved the state assembly without letting Lone to prove his claim.

Opposition to the revocation of special status 
Sajad Gani Lone  has been vocal supporter of special status of Jammu & Kashmir. He was part of an-all party group formed for safeguarding Jammu and Kashmir's special status. Hours before BJP-led centre revoked the special status of the status by reading down the Article 370, Lone was put under house arrest. On 5 August, Lone was arrested by Jammu & Kashmir police and lodged in a jail in Srinagar. He was taken into police custody on 5 August 2019 and was freed from detention on 31 July 2020.

Recognition
 Sajjad Lone featured in list of top 6 Indians of 2015 by Khaleej Times, UAE.

References 

Jammu and Kashmir People's Conference politicians
Living people
Jammu and Kashmir MLAs 2014–2018
People from Baramulla district
State cabinet ministers of Jammu and Kashmir
Indian Muslims
1966 births